Danny Manuel Santoya (born 24 April 1988) is a Colombian striker, who plays for Colombian side Deportes Quindío.

External links

 

1988 births
Living people
Colombian footballers
Colombian expatriate footballers
Categoría Primera A players
Categoría Primera B players
Peruvian Primera División players
Once Caldas footballers
Deportes Quindío footballers
Deportes Tolima footballers
Independiente Medellín footballers
Club Necaxa footballers
Sanat Naft Abadan F.C. players
Unión Magdalena footballers
Alebrijes de Oaxaca players
Deportivo Municipal footballers
Sportspeople from Cartagena, Colombia
Association football forwards
Expatriate footballers in Mexico
Expatriate footballers in Peru
Expatriate footballers in Iran
Colombian expatriate sportspeople in Mexico
Colombian expatriate sportspeople in Peru
Colombian expatriate sportspeople in Iran
21st-century Colombian people